Masudi Al Safar (also Romanized as Mas‘ūdī Āl Şafar and Mas‘ūdī-ye Āl-e Şafar; also known as Sa‘ūdī Al Safar) is a village in Darkhoveyn Rural District, in the Central District of Shadegan County, Khuzestan Province, Iran. At the 2006 census, its population was 50, in 9 families.

References 

Populated places in Shadegan County